The 1969–70 Western Kentucky Hilltoppers men's basketball team represented Western Kentucky University during the 1969-70 NCAA basketball season. The Hilltoppers were led by Ohio Valley Conference Coach of the Year John Oldham and OVC Player of the Year Jim McDaniels.  WKU won the OVC season championship, going undefeated in conference play, and the automatic bid to the 1970 NCAA University Division basketball tournament.  No conference tournament was held, so the bid was awarded to the season champion.  Jerome Perry and Jim Rose joined McDaniels on the All-OVC Team.

Schedule

|-
!colspan=6| Regular Season

|-

 
|-
!colspan=6| 1970 NCAA University Division basketball tournament

References

Western Kentucky Hilltoppers basketball seasons
Western Kentucky
Western Kentucky
Western Kentucky Basketball, Men's
Western Kentucky Basketball, Men's